Dyschirius is a genus of beetles in the family Carabidae:

Species
This is a list of the species in Dyschirius:

 Dyschirius abbreviatus Putzeys, 1846 i c g b
 Dyschirius abditus Fedorenko, 1993 c g
 Dyschirius addisabeba (Bulirsch, 2006) c g
 Dyschirius aeneolus LeConte, 1850
 Dyschirius aeneus (Dejean, 1825) c g
 Dyschirius affinis Fall, 1901 i c g
 Dyschirius afghanus A. Jedlička, 1967 c g
 Dyschirius agnatus Motschulsky, 1844 c g
 Dyschirius aida Schatzmayr, 1936 c g
 Dyschirius alajensis Znojko, 1930 c g
 Dyschirius alticola Lindroth, 1961 i c g
 Dyschirius amazonicus Fedorenko, 1991 c g
 Dyschirius ambiguus Fedorenko, 1994 c g
 Dyschirius amphibolus Jos. Müller, 1922
 Dyschirius amurensis Fedorenko, 1991 c g
 Dyschirius analis Leconte, 1852
 Dyschirius angolensis (Fedorenko, 2000) c g
 Dyschirius angustatus (Ahrens, 1830) c g
 Dyschirius angusticollis Putzeys, 1867 c g
 Dyschirius anichtchenkoi (Bulirsch, 2015) c g
 Dyschirius antoinei Puel, 1925 c g
 Dyschirius apicalis Putzeys, 1846 c g
 Dyschirius aratus Leconte, 1852
 Dyschirius arcanus Bruneau de Miré, 1952 c g
 Dyschirius arcifer Znojko, 1928 c g
 Dyschirius armatus Wollaston, 1864 c g
 Dyschirius arnoldii Gryuntal, 1984 c g
 Dyschirius asper Andrewes, 1929 c g
 Dyschirius assegaaicus (Fedorenko, 2000) c g
 Dyschirius auriculatus Wollaston, 1867 c g
 Dyschirius bacillus Schaum, 1857 c g
 Dyschirius baehri (Bulirsch, 2006) c g
 Dyschirius baenningeri (Fedorenko, 2004) c g
 Dyschirius baicalensis Motschulsky, 1844 c g
 Dyschirius baudoni Antoine, 1952 c g
 Dyschirius bechynei Kult, 1949 c g
 Dyschirius becvari (Bulirsch, 2006) c g
 Dyschirius beludsha Tschitscherine, 1904 c g
 Dyschirius bengalensis Andrewes, 1929 c g
 Dyschirius beydagensis Jeanne, 1996 c g
 Dyschirius bifrons Andrewes, 1929 c g
 Dyschirius binodosus Putzeys, 1878 c g
 Dyschirius boliviensis (Bulirsch, 2015) c g
 Dyschirius bonellii Putzeys, 1846 c g
 Dyschirius bousqueti (Bulirsch, 2006) c g
 Dyschirius braziliensis Fedorenko, 1999
 Dyschirius breviphthalmus Balkenohl & Lompe, 2003 c g
 Dyschirius brevispinus Leconte, 1878
 Dyschirius bruchi (Kult, 1950) c g
 Dyschirius bryanti (Kult, 1950) c g
 Dyschirius buglanensis Bulirsch, 1996 c g
 Dyschirius campicola Lindroth, 1961 i c g b
 Dyschirius cariniceps Baudi di Selve, 1864 c g
 Dyschirius carri Bousquet, 1996 c g
 Dyschirius cerberus Larson, 1968 i c g
 Dyschirius chalceus Erichson, 1837 c g
 Dyschirius chalybeus Putzeys, 1846 c g
 Dyschirius championi Andrewes, 1929 c g
 Dyschirius changlingensis Li, 1992 c g
 Dyschirius cheloscelis H. W. Bates, 1873 c g
 Dyschirius chiricahuae Dajoz, 2004
 Dyschirius clorinda Bulirsch, 2009
 Dyschirius clypeatus Putzeys, 1867 c g
 Dyschirius comatus Bousquet, 1988 i c g
 Dyschirius compactus Lindroth, 1961 i c g
 Dyschirius consobrinus Leconte, 1852
 Dyschirius constrictus Andrewes, 1929 c g
 Dyschirius contortus (Fedorenko, 1997) c g
 Dyschirius crenulatus Putzeys, 1867 c g
 Dyschirius criddlei Fall, 1925 i c g
 Dyschirius crinifer Balkenohl, 1993 c g
 Dyschirius curvispinus Putzeys, 1846 i c g
 Dyschirius cylindricus (Dejean, 1825) c g
 Dyschirius darlingtoni Kult, 1950 c g
 Dyschirius darwini (Kult, 1950) c g
 Dyschirius dejeanii Putzeys, 1846 i c g b
 Dyschirius devroeyianus Burgeon, 1935 c g
 Dyschirius digitatus (Dejean, 1825) c g
 Dyschirius dimidiatus Chaudoir, 1846 c g
 Dyschirius disjunctus Andrewes, 1929 c g
 Dyschirius dispar Péringuey, 1896 c g
 Dyschirius dostali (Bulirsch & Fedorenko, 2007) c g
 Dyschirius ecuadorensis (Bulirsch, 2006) c g
 Dyschirius edentulus Putzeys, 1846 i c g
 Dyschirius eduardinus Burgeon, 1935 c g
 Dyschirius erwini Bulirsch, 2009
 Dyschirius erythrocerus Leconte, 1857 i c g b
 Dyschirius euphraticus Putzeys, 1846 c g
 Dyschirius euxinus Znojko, 1927 c g
 Dyschirius exaratus Putzeys, 1867 c g
 Dyschirius exochus D. R. Whitehead, 1970 i c g
 Dyschirius extensus Putzeys, 1846 c g
 Dyschirius fabbrii (Bulirsch & Magrini, 2006) c g
 Dyschirius facchinii Bulirsch, 2009
 Dyschirius fassatii Kult, 1949 c g
 Dyschirius fedorenkoi (Bulirsch, 2006) c g
 Dyschirius ferganensis Znojko, 1930 c g
 Dyschirius ferrugineus Bousquet, 1988 i c g
 Dyschirius fianarensis Bulirsch, 2006 c g
 Dyschirius filiformis Leconte, 1857
 Dyschirius flavicornis Péringuey, 1896 c g
 Dyschirius fleischeri Sainte-Claire Deville, 1904 c g
 Dyschirius formosanus Kult, 1949 c g
 Dyschirius fossifrons Putzeys, 1867 c g
 Dyschirius franzi Kult, 1954 c g
 Dyschirius freyi A. Jedlička, 1958 c g
 Dyschirius fulgidus Motschulsky, 1850 c g
 Dyschirius fulvipes (Dejean, 1825) c g
 Dyschirius fulvus (Fedorenko, 2000) c g
 Dyschirius fusus Putzeys, 1878 c g
 Dyschirius genieri Bulirsch, 2009
 Dyschirius gerardi Burgeon, 1935 c g
 Dyschirius gibbipennis Leconte, 1857
 Dyschirius girardi Kult, 1949 c g
 Dyschirius globosus Herbst, 1784
 Dyschirius globulosus (Say, 1823) i c g b
 Dyschirius gracilis (Heer, 1837) c g
 Dyschirius guatemalenus H. W. Bates, 1881 c g
 Dyschirius haemorrhoidalis (Dejean, 1831) i c g b
 Dyschirius hajeki Bulirsch, 2009
 Dyschirius hessei Kult, 1954 c g
 Dyschirius heydeni Fleischer, 1899 c g
 Dyschirius hiemalis Bousquet, 1987 i g b
 Dyschirius himalaicus (Fedorenko, 1997) c g
 Dyschirius hingstoni Andrewes, 1929 c g
 Dyschirius hiogoensis H. W. Bates, 1873 c g
 Dyschirius hipponensis Pic, 1894 c g
 Dyschirius hoberlandti Kult, 1954 c g
 Dyschirius horaki (Bulirsch, 2017)
 Dyschirius humeratus Chaudoir, 1850 c g
 Dyschirius humiolcus Chaudoir, 1850 c g
 Dyschirius importunoides Jeanne, 1996 c g
 Dyschirius importunus Schaum, 1857 c g
 Dyschirius impressifrons Fedorenko, 1993 c g
 Dyschirius impressus Putzeys, 1846 c g
 Dyschirius impunctipennis J. F. Dawson, 1854 c g
 Dyschirius insularis (Bulirsch & Fedorenko, 2013) c g
 Dyschirius integer Leconte, 1852
 Dyschirius interior Fall, 1922 i c g b
 Dyschirius intermedius Putzeys, 1846 c g
 Dyschirius intricatus (Fedorenko, 2000) c g
 Dyschirius ivanloebli {Balkenohl & Bulirsch, 2018)
 Dyschirius jedlickai Kult, 1940 c g
 Dyschirius jelineki Bulirsch, 2009
 Dyschirius jindrai Fedorenko, 2004
 Dyschirius jordanicus Fedorenko, 1996
 Dyschirius kabakovi (Fedorenko, 1996) c g
 Dyschirius kadleci Bulirsch, 2009
 Dyschirius kaliki Kult, 1949 c g
 Dyschirius katanganus Burgeon, 1935 c g
 Dyschirius kirghizicus Fedorenko, 1994 c g
 Dyschirius kirschenhoferi (Bulirsch, 2012) c g
 Dyschirius kryzhanovskii Gryuntal, 1984 c g
 Dyschirius lacustris Andrewes, 1929 c g
 Dyschirius laevifasciatus G. H. Horn, 1878
 Dyschirius laeviusculus Putzeys, 1846 c g
 Dyschirius lambertoni Vuillet, 1910 c g
 Dyschirius larochellei Bousquet, 1988 i c g b
 Dyschirius latipennis Seidlitz, 1867 c g
 Dyschirius lgockii Fleischer, 1912 c g
 Dyschirius limpopo (Fedorenko, 2000) c g
 Dyschirius longicollis Motschulsky, 1844 c g
 Dyschirius longipennis Putzeys, 1867 c g
 Dyschirius longulus Leconte, 1850 i c g b
 Dyschirius luticola Chaudoir, 1850 c g
 Dyschirius luzonicus Kult, 1949 c g
 Dyschirius macroderus Chaudoir, 1850 c g
 Dyschirius macrophthalmus (Fedorenko, 1999) c g
 Dyschirius mafuga (Bulirsch, 2006) c g
 Dyschirius magrinii (Bulirsch, 2012) c g
 Dyschirius mahratta Andrewes, 1929 c g
 Dyschirius malawicus (Bulirsch, 2006) c g
 Dyschirius marani Kult, 1949 c g
 Dyschirius matisi Lafer, 1989 c g
 Dyschirius melancholicus Putzeys, 1867 i c g
 Dyschirius mesopotamicus Jos. Müller, 1922
 Dyschirius microthorax Motschulsky, 1844 c g
 Dyschirius milloti Jeannel, 1949 c g
 Dyschirius minarum Putzeys, 1867 c g
 Dyschirius minutus (Dejean, 1825) c g
 Dyschirius montanus Leconte, 1879
 Dyschirius moraveci (Bulirsch, 2006) c g
 Dyschirius morio Putzeys, 1867 c g
 Dyschirius mortchaensis Bruneau de Miré, 1952 c g
 Dyschirius muilwijki (Bulirsch, 2018) c g
 Dyschirius natalensis (Fedorenko, 1997) c g
 Dyschirius neoteutonus Fedorenko, 1991 c g
 Dyschirius neresheimeri H. Wagner, 1915
 Dyschirius nianus Fedorenko, 1993 c g
 Dyschirius nigricornis Motschulsky, 1844 i c g
 Dyschirius nitens Putzeys, 1878 c g
 Dyschirius nitidus (Dejean, 1825) c g
 Dyschirius numidicus Putzeys, 1846 c g
 Dyschirius obscurus (Gyllenhaal, 1827) c g
 Dyschirius ogloblini (Kult, 1950) c g
 Dyschirius opistholius Alluaud, 1936 c g
 Dyschirius ordinatus H. W. Bates, 1873 c g
 Dyschirius orientalis Putzeys, 1867 c g
 Dyschirius owen Dajoz, 2004
 Dyschirius pacificus Lindroth, 1961 i c g
 Dyschirius paleki Kult, 1949 c g
 Dyschirius pallipennis (Say, 1823) i c g b
 Dyschirius pampicola Putzeys, 1867 c g
 Dyschirius parallelus Motschulsky, 1844 c g
 Dyschirius parvulus Péringuey, 1896 c g
 Dyschirius patruelis Leconte, 1852
 Dyschirius paucipunctus Andrewes, 1929 c g
 Dyschirius pauxillus Wollaston, 1864 c g
 Dyschirius peringueyi Kult, 1954 c g
 Dyschirius persicus Fedorenko, 1994 c g
 Dyschirius peruanus Fedorenko, 1991 c g
 Dyschirius perversus Fall, 1922 i c g
 Dyschirius peyrierasi Basilewsky, 1976 c g
 Dyschirius pfefferi Kult, 1949 c g
 Dyschirius pilosus Leconte, 1857 i c g b
 Dyschirius planatus Lindroth, 1961 i c g b
 Dyschirius planiusculus Putzeys, 1867 c g
 Dyschirius politus (Dejean, 1825) i c g b
 Dyschirius puchneri (Bulirsch, 2017)
 Dyschirius pumilus (Dejean, 1825) i c g b
 Dyschirius punctatus (Dejean, 1825) c g
 Dyschirius pusillus (Dejean, 1825) c g
 Dyschirius quadrimaculatus Lindroth, 1961 i c g b
 Dyschirius recurvus Putzeys, 1867 c g
 Dyschirius reitteri Kult, 1949 c g
 Dyschirius rekawaianus Balkenohl, 2021
 Dyschirius roubali Mařan, 1938 c g
 Dyschirius rufimanus Fleischer, 1898 c g
 Dyschirius rufipes (Dejean, 1825) c g
 Dyschirius rugifer Putzeys, 1878 c g
 Dyschirius ruthmuellerae Bulirsch, 2009
 Dyschirius sabahensis Bulirsch, 2009
 Dyschirius safraneki (Bulirsch & Fedorenko, 2013) c g
 Dyschirius salinus Schaum, 1843 c g
 Dyschirius salivagans Leconte, 1875
 Dyschirius saudiarabicus Balkenohl, 1994 c g
 Dyschirius schaumii Putzeys, 1867 c g
 Dyschirius scriptifrons Fleischer, 1898 c g
 Dyschirius sculptus Bousquet, 1988 i c g
 Dyschirius sellatus Leconte, 1857
 Dyschirius selvas (Fedorenko, 1999) c g
 Dyschirius semistriatus (Dejean, 1825) c g
 Dyschirius senegalensis Bruneau de Miré, 1952 c g
 Dyschirius setosus Leconte, 1857
 Dyschirius sevanensis Iablokoff-Khnzorian, 1962 c g
 Dyschirius sextoni Bousquet, 1987 i c g
 Dyschirius shaumii Putzeys, 1866
 Dyschirius sjoestedti Gi. Müller, 1935
 Dyschirius sjostedti Gi. Müller, 1935 c g
 Dyschirius smetanai (Bulirsch, 2011) c g
 Dyschirius smyrnensis (Fedorenko, 1996) c g
 Dyschirius snizeki (Bulirsch, 2011) c g
 Dyschirius soda Dajoz, 2004
 Dyschirius sonamargensis Balkenohl, 1994 c g
 Dyschirius speculifer Andrewes, 1929 c g
 Dyschirius sphaericollis (Say, 1823) i c g b
 Dyschirius sphaerulifer H. W. Bates, 1873 c g
 Dyschirius stellula Andrewes, 1936 c g
 Dyschirius steno H. W. Bates, 1873 c g
 Dyschirius stenoderus Putzeys, 1873 c g
 Dyschirius strumosus Erichson, 1837 c g
 Dyschirius subarcticus Lindroth, 1961 i c g
 Dyschirius sublaevis Putzeys, 1846 i c g b
 Dyschirius substriatus (Duftschmid, 1812) c g
 Dyschirius syriacus Putzeys, 1867 c g
 Dyschirius szeli Bulirsch, 2006 c g
 Dyschirius tamil Andrewes, 1929 c g
 Dyschirius tenuescens Andrewes, 1929 c g
 Dyschirius tenuispinus Lindroth, 1961 i c g b
 Dyschirius terminatus Leconte, 1848
 Dyschirius thailandicus (Fedorenko, 1996) c g
 Dyschirius thoracicus (P. Rossi, 1790) c g
 Dyschirius timidus Lindroth, 1961 i c g
 Dyschirius tonkinensis (Bulirsch & Fedorenko, 2013) c g
 Dyschirius tricuspis Andrewes, 1929 c g
 Dyschirius tridentatus Leconte, 1852
 Dyschirius tristis J. F. Stephens, 1827 c g
 Dyschirius truncatus Leconte, 1857
 Dyschirius unipunctatus Fall, 1901 i c g
 Dyschirius ussuriensis Fedorenko, 1991 c g
 Dyschirius vadoni Jeannel, 1946 c g
 Dyschirius varidens Fall, 1910 i c g b
 Dyschirius verticalis Putzeys, 1878 c g
 Dyschirius vietnamicus (Fedorenko, 2000) c g
 Dyschirius wayah Dajoz, 2005
 Dyschirius weyrauchi Kult, 1950 c g
 Dyschirius wrasei (Bulirsch, 2017)
 Dyschirius yezoensis H. W. Bates, 1883 c g
 Dyschirius zambesiensis (Fedorenko, 2000) c g
 Dyschirius zanzibaricus Chaudoir, 1878 c g
 Dyschirius zimini Znojko, 1928 c g

Data sources: i = ITIS, c = Catalogue of Life, g = GBIF, b = Bugguide.net

References

 
Carabidae genera